Top Chef Junior is an American reality competition television series that serves as a spin-off  of the popular Top Chef series. Ordered in 2008 for an eight-episode run on Bravo, the show had never aired, nor is it known if any episodes were produced at that time. However, nine years later, Top Chef Junior was mentioned as the marquee program for Universal Kids, an NBCUniversal-owned children's channel launched on September 9, 2017. Season 1 consisted of 14 episodes and feature 12 young chefs, aged 9–14. The winner receives $50,000 and the title of Top Chef Junior. The show is hosted by actress Vanessa Lachey, with Top Chef Masters and Top Chef Duels host Curtis Stone serving as its head judge. Top Chef Junior premiered on October 13, 2017. In November 2017 Top Chef Junior was renewed for a 2nd season, which premiered on September 8, 2018. It consists of 12 finalist chefs aged 9–14.

Season 1

Season 1 Contestants 
Sources:

Elimination table

: The chefs were divided into two teams, with the challenge winner coming from the winning team, and the losing chef from the losing team.
: For winning the quickfire challenge, Owen did not participate in the elimination challenge.
: No immunity was awarded for this quickfire challenge.
: The top 3 in the quickfire challenge won immunity and participated in a separate challenge.
: This quickfire was the last one to award immunity to the winner.
: Chef was hospitalized and withdrew for health reasons.
: Chef left
 (WINNER) The chef won the season and was crowned "Top Chef Junior".
 (RUNNER-UP) The chef was a runner-up for the season.
 (WIN) The chef had the best dish in the Quick Fire Challenge, Team Challenge, or Elimination Challenge.
  (WIN) The cook was on the winning team in the Team Challenge 
 (HIGH) The chef was selected as one of the top entries in the Elimination Challenge, Quick Fire Challenge, or Team Challenge but did not Win.
 (IN) The chef was not selected as one of the top or bottom entries in the Elimination Challenge and was safe.
 (LOW) The cook was one of the bottom entries in an elimination challenge, and advanced.
  (IN) The cook was not selected as a top or bottom entry in a Team Challenge.
 (IMM) The chef could not be sent home in the elimination challenge.
 (HIGH) The cook had one of the top dishes in an elimination challenge but did not win.
 (SAFE) Chef was eliminated but drew a safe card and was not eliminated.
 (OUT) The Chef was eliminated from the cooking competition.

Episodes

Episode 1: Dishing Up Dreams 
Original airdate: October 13, 2017

 Quickfire Challenge: Transform your family favorite meal into a restaurant quality masterpiece
 Winner: Milo
 Elimination Challenge: Create a dish that showcases your food dream
 Guest judge: Richard Blais
 Winner: Rahanna
 Out: Fernando

Episode 2: Food Truck Frenzy 
Original airdate: October 20, 2017

 Quickfire Challenge: Highlight your cooking technique in a dished based on a memorable adventure
 Winner: Jasmine
 Elimination Challenge: In less than 24 hours, open 3 food trucks to the public

 Guest judge: Dave Danhi
 Winner: Fuller
 Out: Katelyn

Episode 3: Battle of the Buds 
Original airdate: October 27, 2017

 Quickfire Challenge: Create an ice cream dessert
 Winner: Jasmine
 Elimination Challenge: Create a dish highlighting one of the five tastes

Battle winners in Bold
 Guest judge: Brooke Williamson
 Winner: Audrey
 Out: Max

Episode 4: Chef's Best Friend 
Original airdate: November 3, 2017

 Quickfire Challenge: Make a gourmet dog treat
 Winner: Milo
 Elimination Challenge: Create a cohesive meal using ingredients typically found in your refrigerators at home

 Guest judge: Sherry Yard
 Winner: Rahanna
 Safe: Jasmine

Episode 5: Food Fight! 
Original airdate: November 10, 2017

 Quickfire Challenge: Impress Bryan Voltaggio and Michael Voltaggio with your culinary skills
 Winner: Owen
 Elimination Challenge:  Four head-to-head 30 minute food fight rounds coached by Bryan and Michael Voltaggio

Battle winners in Bold
 Guest judge: Tito Ortiz
 Winner: Kenzie
 Out: Audrey

Episode 6: It's No Cake Walk 
Original airdate: November 17, 2017

 Quickfire Challenge: In pairs, using only one hand each, make a dozen cupcakes
 Winner: Henry & Maxine
 Elimination Challenge: Bake a 14-inch extreme cake

 Guest judge: Joshua John Russell
 Winner: Rahanna & Milo
 Safe: Maxine
 Withdraw: Fuller

Episode 7: Glow Big or Go Home 
Original airdate: December 1, 2017

 Quickfire Challenge: Make a dish using a cut of beef selected from the "Beef or Buzzer" game board
 Winner: Rahanna
 Elimination Challenge: Using at least one ingredient that glows, make a late night dish for Maisy Stella's Glow Party
 Guest judge: Casey Thompson
 Winner: Milo
 Out: Maxine

Episode 8: Field Day! 
Original airdate: December 8, 2017

 Quickfire Challenge: Create an elevated nacho dish
 Winner: Milo
 The overall winner won a Buzzfeed Tasty Video prize. The top 3 in the quickfire challenges also won immunity.
 Elimination Challenge: (Top 3) Create a spin on burger & fries or (Bottom 3) BBQ plate with a side & sauce
 Guest judge: Nick Lachey
 Winner: Milo
 Out: Kenzie

Episode 9: Un-bee-lievable 
Original airdate: December 15, 2017

 Quickfire Challenge: Make a dish highlighting honey
 Winner: Henry
 Elimination Challenge: Create a kids' menu with an elevated entrée, side & dessert
 Guest judge: Emeril Lagasse
 Winner: Owen
 Safe: Milo

Episode 10: Restaurant Wars 
Original airdate: January 5, 2018

 Quickfire Challenge: Create an amuse-bouche
 Winner: Rahanna
 Elimination Challenge: Create and design 2 restaurants to open in 24 hours

For winning the quickfire challenge, Rahanna was assigned to both teams
 Guest judge: Cat Cora
 Winner: Henry
 Out: Jasmine

Episode 11: The Claw 
Original airdate: January 12, 2018

 Quickfire Challenge: Cook a lobster dish using the basic pantry or add ingredients from the claw game
 Winner: Henry
 Elimination Challenge: Create an exotic surf & turf dish ( snake and crocodile food )
as Henry wins, he is allowed to choose a protein and then no one is allowed to choose that protein
 Guest judge: Dave Salmoni
 Winner: Milo
 Out: Henry

Episode 12: Cooking for Treasure 
Original airdate: 

Quickfire Challenge: "Keepin' Up With Curtis." Chefs are challenged to replicate Head Judge Curtis Stone's dish alongside him. 
 Winner: Milo
Elimination Challenge: After a tiki-themed scavenger hunt at Universal Orlando Volcano Bay, create a Polynesian luau
 Guest judge: Roy Yamaguchi
 Winner: Milo
 Safe: Rahanna

Episode 13: Lemon Aid 
Original airdate: 

Quickfire Challenge: At the Houdini Estate, chefs must unlock boxes to retrieve proteins. 
 Winner: Owen
Elimination Challenge: As part of a fundraiser in connection with Alex's Lemonade Stand, chefs must prepare a dish featuring lemons.
 Guest judge: Susan Feniger
 Winner: Owen
 Out: Milo

Episode 14: You Are Top Chef Junior! 
Original airdate: 

Quickfire Challenge: None
Elimination Challenge: The chefs were asked to create a three-course meal representing their culinary past, present and future.
 Guest judges: Antonia Lofaso, Tiffany Derry
 Winner: Owen
 Runner Up: Rahanna

Season 2

Season 2 Contestants 
Sources:

Elimination table

:  No immunity was awarded for this quickfire challenge.

: Before the quick-fire challenge a team challenge took place for advantages in the quick-fire. The best 5 dishes in the quickfire were awarded immunity while the worst 4 dishes were facing elimination in the next round.
: Two Chefs were eliminated in the elimination challenge.

: There was no Quick-Fire in this Episode

: Chef had Immunity

: Chef did not cook in this challenge due to strep throat

 (WINNER) The chef won the season and was crowned "Top Chef Junior".
 (RUNNER-UP) The chef was a runner-up for the season.
 (WIN) The chef had the best dish in the Quick Fire Challenge, Team Challenge, or Elimination Challenge.
  (WIN) The cook was on the winning team in the Team Challenge 
 (HIGH) The chef was selected as one of the top entries in the Elimination Challenge, Quick Fire Challenge, or Team Challenge but did not Win.
 (IN) The chef was not selected as one of the top or bottom entries in the Elimination Challenge or Quick Fire Challenge and was safe.
 (LOW) The cook was one of the bottom entries in an Elimination challenge, Team challenge   or Quick Fire and advanced.
  (IN) The cook was not selected as a top or bottom entry in a Team Challenge.
 (IMM) The chef could not be sent home in the elimination challenge .
 (HIGH) The cook had one of the top dishes in an elimination challenge but did not win.
 (SAFE) Chef was eliminated but drew a safe card and continued on in the competition.
 (OUT) The Chef was Eliminated from the Competition.

Episodes 

Episode 0:  Making the Cut

Original airdate:  August 4, 2018

At boot camp, 22 talented young chefs compete for their chance to make the cast of the second season of the series.

Episode 1: Stirring Up a Celebration 
Original airdate: September 8, 2018

 Quickfire Challenge: After making it through boot camp, the 12 junior chefs joined Vanessa and Curtis for a small celebration with a large spread of snacks and hors d'oeuvres. Following the celebration, the junior chefs were told that their first quickfire challenge was to create an amuse-bouche in 30 minutes using the leftover ingredients from the party. The winner received immunity from elimination.
 Winner: Carson
 Elimination Challenge:  The junior chefs were challenged to create a signature winning dish for the first Top Chef Junior Food Festival.
 Guest Judge: Richard Blais
 Winner: Eric
 Eliminated: Tyler

Episode 2: Sunny Side Up 
Original airdate: September 15, 2018

 Quickfire Challenge: The junior chefs were challenged to create a unique ramen dish in 20 minutes. The winner received immunity from elimination.
 Winner: Kate
 Elimination Challenge: The judges surprised the junior chefs early in the morning at their rooms with the challenge of creating a delicious brunch dish. The junior chefs had a limited pantry of the ingredients brought to them by the judges and were only able to use the equipment found in their rooms. 
 Winner: Ella
 Eliminated: Sophie

Episode 3: Rolling In Dough 

Original airdate: September 22, 2018

  Quickfire Challenge: The junior chefs were challenged to create a unique pizza. However, the junior chefs had to play the arcade game Alley Roller in order to get tickets to buy additional ingredients (only simple dough, plain tomato sauce, and mozzarella cheese were available by default). Additionally, tickets could be used to purchase kitchen equipment that the junior chefs could take home with them after the Top Chef Junior competition.
 Winner: Simon
 Elimination Challenge: The chefs were divided into two teams: the yellow team and the blue team. For their challenge, the junior chefs competed in a series of head-to-head battles where each pair of chefs (one from the yellow team and one from the blue team) had to create a kid-friendly dish highlighting a specific ingredient. In each battle, the panel of judges and kid tasters would vote for their favorite dish; the chef with the most votes scored a point for their team. The team that earned three points first won the overall challenge. The winners of each head-to-head battle are indicated below in bold.
Yellow Team: Rogers, Carson, Ella, Simon, Kate
 Blue Team: Noah, Nikki, Olivia, Eric, Londyn
 Round 1 (Olives): Kate vs Nikki
 Round 2 (Broccoli): Rogers vs Eric
 Round 3 (Brussels Sprouts): Ella vs Noah
 Round 4 (Salmon): Simon vs Olivia
 Round 5 (Beets): Carson vs Londyn
 Winning Team: Blue Team
 Winner: Londyn
 Saved:  Kate

Episode 4:  Sweet Dreams Come True

Original Airdate:  September 29, 2018

 Quickfire Challenge: Prior to the competition, the junior chefs were all asked what dream ingredient they would love to work with. For this challenge, those dream ingredients were provided for them and each chef had to create a winning dish highlighting their choice. The winner received immunity from elimination.
 Winner:  Nikki
 Elimination Challenge: The junior chefs were challenged to create a sweet dessert for an event raising awareness for the charity Adopt Together.
Guest Judge:  Candace Nelson
Winner:  Olivia
Eliminated:  Kate

Episode 5:  Field Day!

Original Airdate:  October 6, 2018

Guest Judge:  Reggie Bush

Chefs participate in teams in three rounds

 Red Team:  Eric, Ella, Noah
 Yellow Team:  Carson, Rogers, Nikki
 Blue Team:  Londyn, Olivia, Simon

 Round 1:  Obstacle Course: The team must wear foam ski's, walk together to three obstacles 
 Bobbing for Tomatoes, 3 tomatoes per chef per team
 Spiralize 6 onions
 Fruit Stand Ball Pit, one member at a time per team must find a watermelon, cantaloupe, grapefruit, green apple, lemon, and orange.
 Dunk Tank:  Throw a football to dunk Curtis Stone in the Dunk Tank.

The first two teams to finish win a significant advantage in the Gameday Quickfire Challenge.

 Winners:  Blue and Yellow Teams

 Round 2:  Quickfire Challenge: Create the perfect sandwich.  Chefs have 25 minutes to cook.  This is an individual challenge with the top 5 Chefs receiving immunity in the Elimination Challenge.
 Blue team received an extra 10 minutes to cook and first choice of the limited pantry ingredients as their advantages
 Yellow team received an extra 5 minutes to cook and second choice of pantry ingredients.
 Winners:  Rogers, Londyn, Olivia, Carson, and Nikki (overall winner, received a Football autographed by Reggie Bush)

 Round 3:  Elimination Challenge:  Wings and Sausage Challenge
 Top Team: Wings and a Dipping Sauce in 45 minutes
 Winner:  Nikki who received a Top Chef Jr. Football Helmet signed by Reggie Bush
 Bottom Team: Sausages in 90 minutes
 Eliminated:  Ella

Awards and nominations

References

External links 
  Official Website

2017 American television seasons
2018 American television seasons
Top Chef
Universal Kids original programming
2010s American reality television series
American television spin-offs
Reality television spin-offs
Cooking competitions in the United States
Television series about children
Television series about teenagers